Kellococha (possibly from Quechua q'illu yellow, qucha lake, lagoon, "yellow lake"), also spelled Kellococha, Kelloccocha, Quellococha, also Qellococha, Qelloqocha, Q'elloqocha, is a lake in Peru located in the Cusco Region, Urubamba Province, Huaylllabamba District. Kellococha is known for its woods of polylepis  which also occur at the neighboring lake named Yanacocha.

See also 
 Machu Qullqa

References 

Lakes of Peru
Lakes of Cusco Region